Ardozyga elpistis is a species of moth in the family Gelechiidae. It was described by Edward Meyrick in 1904. It is found in Australia, where it has been recorded from Western Australia.

The forewings are fuscous, sprinkled with whitish and dark fuscous. The stigmata are rather indistinct, dark fuscous, the plical obliquely beyond the first discal. The hindwings are light grey.

References

Ardozyga
Moths described in 1904
Taxa named by Edward Meyrick
Moths of Australia